The Jerboa SP was a sports prototype racing car built by Jerboa in 1970. The car started out life as a Ginetta G12, and was entered by Jack Wheeler in various events in 1970 and 1971, using 1-litre, 1.3-litre, and 1.6-litre BMC straight-four engines.

Racing history
The Jerboa SP made its racing debut at the Targa Florio in 1970, with Jack Wheeler selecting Martin Davidson as his co-driver, and the car was fitted with a 1.3-litre BMC A-series straight-four engine. However, the team did not complete the first lap due to an accident. Wheeler and Davidson then entered the car at the 1000 km of Nürburgring, but did not actually attend the race; the car had been fitted with a 1.6-litre BMC engine for the event. A 1-litre A-Series was fitted for the Mugello Grand Prix, and Davidson drove the car to second place in the Prototype 1000 class. The 1.3 litre engine was refitted for the 500 km of Nürburgring, and Wheeler took the Prototype 1300 class victory, finishing 21st overall. Wheeler then finished 17th overall at the 500 km of Spa, which would prove to be the car's best overall finish. He also entered the car at the Nürburgring - Sports, Prototypes and Can-Am race in October, but did not compete in the race. The car's next appearance came at the 1971 Targa Florio, where the car was classified 40th overall, and second in the Prototype 1300 category, but Davidson and Wheeler had to retire the car after seven laps, due to clutch failure. Two weeks later, the pair entered the 1000 km of Nürburgring, with the car featuring a 1.6-litre engine again; however, although it was classified 28th, and third in the Prototype 1600 category, the team had again retired, this time after 29 laps. This proved to be the car's last race, as it was never used again.

References

Sports prototypes